Events in the year 1769 in Spain.

Incumbents
King: Charles III

Events

Castillo de Guardias Viejas built in Almeria, Andalusia

Births
Enrique O'Donnell, Conde del Abisbal, Spanish general of Irish descent (d. 1834)

References

 
1760s in Spain
Years of the 18th century in Spain